Vladimir Matijašević (born 10 May 1978) is a Serbian former professional footballer who played as a defender.

Matijašević started his playing career at Mladost Lučani in 1995. He then spent some time with Vojvodina, before moving to AEK Athens in 1999. Matijašević also played for Red Star Belgrade, Železnik, Shandong Luneng and Apollon Kalamarias.

Statistics

Honours
Shandong Luneng
Chinese FA Cup: 2004

References

External links
 

Serbia and Montenegro footballers
AEK Athens F.C. players
Apollon Pontou FC players
Association football defenders
Chinese Super League players
Expatriate footballers in China
Expatriate footballers in Greece
FK Mladost Lučani players
FK Vojvodina players
FK Železnik players
Sportspeople from Čačak
Red Star Belgrade footballers
Serbia and Montenegro expatriate footballers
Serbia and Montenegro under-21 international footballers
Shandong Taishan F.C. players
1978 births
Living people